Wailes is a surname. Notable people with the surname include:

Alexandria Wailes, American actress
Andrew Wailes (born 1971), Australian conductor
Edward T. Wailes (1903–1969), American diplomat
Kyle Wailes (born 1983), Canadian lacrosse player
Rex Wailes (1901–1986), English engineer and historian
Rusty Wailes (1936–2002), American rower
William Wailes (1808–1881), English stained glass manufacturer